"Lost My Baby Blues" is a song written by Ben Peters, and recorded by American country music artist David Frizzell.  It was released in October 1982 as the second single from the album The Family's Fine, But This One's All Mine.  The song reached #5 on the Billboard Hot Country Singles & Tracks chart.

Chart performance

References

1983 singles
1982 songs
David Frizzell songs
Songs written by Ben Peters
Song recordings produced by Snuff Garrett
Warner Records singles